Hoher List Observatorium is an Observatory located on the Hoher List mountain (549 m ASL) about 60 km south-west of the city of Bonn, close to the town of Daun in the Eifel region (Rhineland-Palatinate)

History 
The observatory of Bonn was founded by Friedrich Wilhelm August Argelander (1799 - 1875). His friendship to Prussian king Friedrich Wilhelm IV facilitated the deployment of the observatory in the years 1840 to 1844 by architect Karl Friedrich Schinkel. Argelander came to esteem in astronomy through his famous Bonner Durchmusterung, which resulted in a star catalogue containing 325.000 stars.

Astronomical observations were carried out at the old Bonn Observatory until the 50’s of last century. However, the steady brightening of the night sky over the city by the light pollution (street lights, illumination of buildings) rendered observations more and more difficult. Hence, the then director of Bonn Observatory, Friedrich Becker (in German), saw the importance to find a location sufficiently distant from any artificial lights on the one hand, but sufficiently close to the institute at Bonn to ensure a close connection of students and staff of Bonn astronomy. An alternative site was successfully searched for in 1949 with the help by a botanist who worked in the Eifel area and was interested in astronomy. In a conversation with the then assistant astronomer Hans Schmidt (in German),Becker’s successor, the top of the Hoher List mountain above the village of Schalkenmehren was identified as a good site for astronomical observations. This rural environment was featured by a dark night sky, unasffected by artificial sky brightening. It was decided to deploy the observatory there and transfer the telescopes from the location in Bonn to this mountain range.

In 1954 the new "Observatorium Hoher List" was inaugurated, with its first dome hosting a Schmidt telescope with a 50-cm mirror. A major extension in 1964 implied the transfer of the double refractor (in German) built in 1899 from Bonn to the Eifel. The last dome of the observatory was constructed in 1966 errichtet, and a 1-m Cassegrain telescope was inserted, now the largest and most modern telescope at Hoher List.

Since its deployment the observatory has been an outpost of Bonn Observatory (since 2006: Observatory Department of the Argelander Institute for Astronomy of the University of Bonn), where many students have obtained their diploma or doctoral degree, and where many important scientific projects in the field of astrometry (position and motion) and photometry (brightness and colour) of stars in our Milky Way have been published. 

Eventually, the "Observatory Hoher List" lost its former scientific standing because scientific observations became more and more difficult in the Eifel region. The brightness of the night sky had increased, the weather conditions and quality of instruments were inferior to those of the excellent observing sites in Chile or in the USA. Therefore, the observatory started to serve for the practical part of student education and provided a laboratory for the development of astronomical instrumentation that could be implemented in telescopes e.g. in Spain or Chile.

Shut-down and further utilization 
In February 2012, the Argelander Institute for Astronomy ceased any scientific education and observing completely, and the University of Bonn shut down the observatory in July 2012. The scientific instrumentation, including all telescopes, were to be vended thereafter, which was actually done in case of the 50-cm Schmidt telescope. The Schröder refractor was transferred to Bonn for a permanent exhibition. In September 2013, the observatory was put under monument protection by the Landesdenkmalpflege Rheinland-Pfalz, in order to prevent its full dismantling. One month earlier, the former observatory's friends' association was renamed as Astronomische Vereinigung Vulkaneifel am Hoher List e.V. (AVV). Since then, this non-profit club maintains the observatory by carrying out regular guides, public talks and observing events for the public.

On March 1, 2020 the real estate with its observatory was purchased by a former staff member. Since then, the AVV has access to all telescopes at Hoher List so that the range of activities for visitors could be greatly expanded. A recently applied new silvering of both, the 1-m and the Ritchey-Chrétien telescope furnished these instruments with optimum imaging performance. The following table lists the current instrumentation at Hoher List Observatory.

Guides for visitors, which include a talk on astronomical themes are taking place on Saturdays between April 1 and October 31, starting at 3 p.m. From November 1 through March 31, starting at 8 p.m., observations with telescopes of Hoher List Observatory are offered to visitors as weather conditions allow. Public talks given by experienced amateur astronomers and by university lecturers of astronomy on various astronomical subjects are held every third Wednesday of the month, from February through November, starting at 7 p.m., with observations offered thereafter. 

AVV members and visitors convene every Tuesday at 7 p.m. In case of clear sky, observations of the moon, planets, galactic Nebulae and galaxies are carried out. In case of cloudy skies, spontaneous talks are given, or questions emerging from the audience are discussed.

See also
 List of astronomical observatories

Notes and references 
 1. astro.uni-bonn.de:  Argelander Institute for Astronomy (AIfA)
 2. List of culture monuments / Nachrichtliches Verzeichnis der Kulturdenkmäler. (PDF; 1,4 MB) Kreis Vulkaneifel. Generaldirektion Kulturelles Erbe Rheinland-Pfalz, page 47, as of October 2013.(in German)
 3. Observatoy: New owner / Sternwarte: Neuer Besitzer am Hohen List. As of 8. Oktober 2020. (in German)

Weblinks 
Commons: Hoher List Observatory – Album with pictures

 AVV – Astronomische Vereinigung Vulkaneifel am Hohen List e. V. (In German)

Astronomical observatories in Germany
Buildings and structures in Rhineland-Palatinate
Hoher List Observatory